January 3 - Eastern Orthodox liturgical calendar - January 5

All fixed commemorations below are observed on January 17 by Orthodox Churches on the Old Calendar.

For January 4, Orthodox Churches on the Old Calendar commemorate the Saints listed on December 22.

Feasts
 Forefeast of the Theophany.

Saints
 Synaxis of the Seventy Apostles.
 Martyr Djan Darada, the Ethiopian eunuch of Queen Candace (1st century)  (see also: June 17, August 27)
 Martyrs Chrysanthus and Euthymia.
 Martyrs Zosimas the Hermit and Athanasius the Commentarisius (prison warden), anchorites of Cilicia (3rd-4th century)
 Venerable Theoprobus of Karpasia, Bishop of Karpasia in Cyprus (4th century)
 Venerable Apollinaria the Senator (5th century)  (see also: January 5)
 Venerable Evagrius (fellow-ascetic of St. Shio of Mgvime), with St. Elias the Deacon, and other Disciples of the Thirteen Syrian Fathers, of the Shio-Mgvime Monastery in Georgia (6th century)
 The Holy Six Martyrs.  (see also: January 15)
 Saint Euthymius the Younger of Thessalonica (Euthymius the New), monk.
 Venerable Timothy the Stylite (872)
 Hieromartyr Alexander, Bishop.
 Martyr Uvelicius.
 Martyr Amma.

Pre-Schism Western saints
 Saint Linus, the first Pope of Rome (c. 76)   (In the East: Jan 4 and Nov 5) 
 Saint Clement I, one of the Seventy Apostles, he was the third Pope of Rome (c. 101)   (In the East: Jan 4, Apr 22, Sept 10 and Nov 25)
 Saint Mavilus (Majulus), a martyr in Hadrumetum in North Africa, thrown to wild beasts at the time of Caracalla (212)
 Martyrs Priscus, Priscillian and Benedicta, in Rome (c. 361 - 363)
 Martyr Dafrosa (Affrosa), the mother of St Bibiana, was martyred in Rome under Julian the Apostate (c. 361 - 363)
 Martyrs Aquilinus, Geminus, Eugene, Marcian, Quintus, Theodotus and Tryphon, in North Africa under the Arian Hunneric, King of the Vandals (c. 484)
 Saint Gregory of Langres, Bishop of Langres in Gaul, renowned for miracles (539-540)
 Saint Ferreolus of Uzès, Bishop of Uzès (581)
 Saint Pharäildis (Vareide, Verylde, Veerle), one of the patron-saints of Ghent (c. 740)
 Saint Rigobert, Archbishop of Rheims and Confessor (c. 745)
 Venerable Theoctistus of Sicily, Abbot at Cucomo (Coucouma, Coucoumis) in Sicily (800)
 Saint Libentius (Liäwizo I), born in Swabia in Germany, he became Archbishop of Hamburg in 988 (1013)

Post-Schism Orthodox saints
 Venerable Hieromartyr Abbot Euthymius, and twelve Monk-martyrs of Vatopedi Monastery, on Mt. Athos,  who suffered martyrdom for denouncing the Latinizing rulers Michael Paleologos and John Bekkos as heretics (1285)
 Repose of St. Eustathius I of Serbia (Eustace of Serbia, Jevstatije I), Archbishop of Serbia (1286)
 Saint Aquila (Aquilae, Achillios), Deacon of the Kiev Caves Monastery (14th century)
 Venerable Symeon of Smolensk, Metropolitan of Smolensk (1699)
 New Monk-martyr Onuphrius Manassias of Gabrovo and Chilandar Monastery, Mt. Athos, on Chios (1818)
 Venerable Nikephoros the Leper (1964)

New martyrs and confessors
 New Hieromartyr Alexander Yuzefovitch, Priest, at Alma-Ata (1921)
 New Hieromartyr Philip Gregoriev, Protopresbyter, at Alma-Ata (1933)
 New Hieromartyr Stephen Ponomarev, Priest (1933)
 New Hieromartyr Nicholas Maslov, Priest, at Alma-Ata (1939)
 New Hieromartyr Paul Felitsyn, Priest (1941)

Other commemorations
 Finding of the holy relics (January 4, 1974) of New Martyr John the ex-Muslim of Konitsa (John of Ioannina) (September 23, 1814), in the Holy Monastery of Prousou in Evrytania, Greece.

Icon gallery

Notes

References

Sources
 January 4/January 17. Orthodox Calendar (PRAVOSLAVIE.RU).
 January 17 / January 4. HOLY TRINITY RUSSIAN ORTHODOX CHURCH (A parish of the Patriarchate of Moscow).
 January 4. OCA - The Lives of the Saints.
 The Autonomous Orthodox Metropolia of Western Europe and the Americas (ROCOR). St. Hilarion Calendar of Saints for the year of our Lord 2004. St. Hilarion Press (Austin, TX). p. 5.
 January 4. Latin Saints of the Orthodox Patriarchate of Rome.
 The Roman Martyrology. Transl. by the Archbishop of Baltimore. Last Edition, According to the Copy Printed at Rome in 1914. Revised Edition, with the Imprimatur of His Eminence Cardinal Gibbons. Baltimore: John Murphy Company, 1916. pp. 5–6.
Greek Sources
 Great Synaxaristes:  4 ΙΑΝΟΥΑΡΙΟΥ. ΜΕΓΑΣ ΣΥΝΑΞΑΡΙΣΤΗΣ.
  Συναξαριστής. 4 Ιανουαρίου. ECCLESIA.GR. (H ΕΚΚΛΗΣΙΑ ΤΗΣ ΕΛΛΑΔΟΣ). 
Russian Sources
  17 января (4 января). Православная Энциклопедия под редакцией Патриарха Московского и всея Руси Кирилла (электронная версия). (Orthodox Encyclopedia - Pravenc.ru).
  4 января (ст.ст.) 17 января 2013 (нов. ст.). Русская Православная Церковь Отдел внешних церковных связей. (DECR).

January in the Eastern Orthodox calendar